The Master of the Heisterbach Altarpiece was a German painter active around Cologne between 1440 and 1460.

Style
The work of the Master of the Heisterbach Altarpiece shows traces of the influence of Stefan Lochner, duly following his compositional models and use of tone. The master may have been a member of Lochner's workshop.

The master is also attributed with an altarpiece from the parish of Saint Christopher in Colonia, dated to 1445 and now kept in the Alte Pinacoteck of Monaco. That work has a central piece Crucifixion with Six Apostles and the Virgin, around it are other apostles, and on the exterior Saints Christopher and Gereon.

The master's workshop, or that of Lochner, also produced two altar doors in Cologne's church to Saint Andrea. Its two remaining fragments are also kept in the Alte Pinacoteck.

Name
The master's notname is derived from a  apostolic altarpiece in the monastery of Heisterbach. The altarpiece was probably commissioned by the abbot Christiann, who died in 1448, and it is now mostly stored in the museum of Bamberg. It contains paintings of saints and apostles and 16 scenes from the life of Jesus Christ.

References

Sources
 Chapuis, Julien. Stefan Lochner: Image Making in Fifteenth-Century Cologne. Turnhout: Brepols, 2004. 

15th-century German painters
Heisterbach Altarpiece, Master of the